Hussein Arnous (born 1953) is a Syrian politician who has served as prime minister of Syria since 11 June 2020. Arnous's appointment was announced by state media shortly after it was reported that President Bashar al-Assad had fired previous prime minister Imad Khamis amid a worsening economic crisis.

Early life and education 
Arnous was born in the village of Al-Tah in the Ma'arrat al-Nu'man District, Idlib. In 1978, he earned a degree in civil engineering from the University of Aleppo.

Career 
After graduating from university, Arnous worked with the Idlib Engineering Syndicate. From 1992 to 2002, he managed the General Company for Roads and Bridges. In 2004, Arnous was selected to serve as executive director of the General Establishment for Road Transport. He then served as governor of Deir ez-Zor and Quneitra governorates. In 2014, Arnous was included on a list of Syrian government ministers barred from entering the United States or European Union.

Arnous served as Minister of Public Works and Housing from 2013 until 2018 and as Minister of Water Resources since 26 November 2018.

Arnous was confirmed by President Assad to be the prime minister of a new government on 30 August 2020. He took the oath of office three days later. He formed a new government in August 2021 after the presidential election in May 2021.

References 

1953 births
University of Aleppo alumni
Living people
Members of the Regional Command of the Arab Socialist Ba'ath Party – Syria Region
People from Idlib Governorate
Prime Ministers of Syria
Syrian Sunni Muslims
21st-century Syrian politicians